Rhythm & Romance was the fifth studio album by American singer-songwriter Rosanne Cash. It was released on Columbia Records on May 6, 1985; her fourth album for the label. The album's first single "I Don't Know Why You Don't Want Me" was released on February 6, 1985, winning Cash her first Grammy award. The second single; "Never Be You" was released on September 12, 1985, the third single; "Hold On" was released on February 15, 1986; the album's fourth and final single; "Second to No One" was released on July 19, 1986.

Although Cash had written at least one composition on each of her previous albums, this is the first of her albums on which she wrote or co-wrote the majority of the tracks.

Track listing

Personnel
Rosanne Cash: Vocals
Anton Fig: Drums
Vince Gill: Background Vocals
David Hungate: Bass
Jennifer Kimball: Background Vocals
Benmont Tench: Electric Piano
Waddy Wachtel: Electric Guitar
Larry Crane: Guitar
Anthony Crawford: Background Vocals
Patricia Darcy: Background Vocals
Bob Glaub: Bass
Steve Goldstein: Keyboards
Ula Hedwig: Background Vocals
Dave Innis: Keyboards
Paul Leim: Drums
Randy McCormick: Keyboards
Robert Sabino: Synthesizer
Billy Joe Walker Jr.: Electric Guitar
Willie Weeks: Bass

Charts

Weekly charts

Year-end charts

References

1985 albums
Rosanne Cash albums
Columbia Records albums
Albums produced by David Malloy
Albums produced by Rodney Crowell